The 1983–84 IHF Women's Cup Winners' Cup was the eighth edition of IHF's competition for European women's handball national cup champions. As the previous edition, it was contested by 20 teams. Powerhouses East Germany and the Soviet Union didn't take part in the competition.

Dalma Split won its first European trophy, beating TJ Gottwaldov in the final. It was the third of five consecutive editions won by Yugoslav teams. Defending champion RK Osijek was knocked out by Gottwaldov in the quarterfinals.

Results

Final stages

References

Women's EHF Cup Winners' Cup
1983 in handball
1984 in handball